KatG is an enzyme that functions as both catalase and peroxidase.  Its mutation is the cause for Mycobacterium (specifically M. tuberculosis) resistance with the drug isoniazid, which targets the mycolic acids within the tuberculosis bacteria. Due to both its catalase and peroxidase activity, this enzyme protects M. Tuberculosis against reactive oxygen species. M. tuberculosis' survival within macrophages depends on the KatG enzyme.

References

Bacterial enzymes